All Dead Mormons Are Now Gay is a satirical website which states that it converts deceased Mormons into homosexuals 
in the afterlife.

Purpose
The site is meant to mock the Mormon practice of posthumous baptism on unwilling people, especially that of Jewish and LGBT Holocaust victims, which has been widely seen as antisemitic, homophobic and overall offensive. The site allows one to insert the name of "their favorite dead Mormon" into a slide and click the "Convert!" button to "baptize" the person into "the joys of homosexuality". There is also a "Choose-a-Mormon" option if the user does not have a specific Mormon in mind. The website warns that there is no way to undo this act.

Reception
Within a few days the site garnered 17,000 likes on Facebook but drew the ire of many Mormons and some from the Christian right due to their belief that it was blasphemous. Jay Michaelson of Religion Dispatches named the site his favorite of 2012. Jack Werner of Sveriges Radio called the news of the site "perhaps the oddest news story" of February 2012.

See also
 Shoah
 Persecution of homosexuals in Nazi Germany

Notes

References

External links

Posthumous recognitions
LGBT and Mormonism
Satirical websites
Internet properties established in 2012
Religious comedy websites
Mormonism-related controversies